The Singing Detective is a 2003 American musical crime comedy film directed by Keith Gordon and loosely based on the BBC serial of the same name, a work by British writer Dennis Potter. It stars Robert Downey Jr. and features a supporting cast that includes Katie Holmes, Adrien Brody, Robin Wright Penn, Mel Gibson, Jeremy Northam and Carla Gugino as well as a number of songs from the 1950s.

Plot 

Detective novelist Dan Dark is hospitalized due to a skin disease named psoriasis and crippling psoriatic arthritis. Around doctors and nurses, he occasionally hallucinates them in choreographed musical numbers. They attempt to help Dark, but are dismissed by Dark's anger and bitterness towards everyone. In an attempt to solve his mental issues, the doctors send him to psychiatrist Dr. Gibbon. The doctor suspects the thoughts behind these problems are in Dark's novel The Secret Detective, which is about a nightclub singer/private eye, hired by Mark Binney, who takes on a strange case involving prostitutes and two mysterious men. He fantasizes about the book during these meetings, with people from the real world acting as the fictional characters.

After reading some pages, Gibbon thinks Dark may have a problem with women. This leads to Dark flashing back to his childhood, when his mother worked as a prostitute and had sex with several men at the home, including his father's business partner. People he encountered in his childhood act as characters in fantasies of his novel; his mother is a prostitute, his father's business partner is a rich guy, and two passengers he only once encounter on a bus are thugs.

Despite his skin condition improving, his attitude worsens after learning a film studio is interested in purchasing the rights for The Singing Detective. He is informed of this by his wife Nicola, who also is a prostitute in the book fantasies. He is paranoid that Nicola is trying to steal the work so she can make money, and that Gibbon was met by a "whore" trying to get into the situation. Additionally, the two thugs from the fantasies have entered the real world, planning to rebel against the author for making them "stand around" constantly instead of playing more important roles, like being officers of the federal government.

Eventually, however, Dark is mentally cured through a civil discussion with Gibbon about his childhood. He states his father didn't care about him due to being a "pain-in-the-ass" to raise, and Dan was often alone in his room to read. His father also constantly beat up his wife and kid. Just as he is about to be released from the hospital, he has another hallucination where reality meets his novel fantasies; the two thugs quickly drag his hospital bed throughout the building and attempt to kill him, while he also imagines himself as the detective alongside other vaudeville women. It ends with the fictional detective shooting the real author. After the hallucination, he leaves the hospital with his wife.

Cast

Production
Potter's screenplay had been circulating in Hollywood for many years as Potter was enthusiastic about a film version. Robert Altman was at one time attached to direct with Dustin Hoffman in the lead, but financing proved difficult and the production was shelved. It was eventually discovered by an executive at Mel Gibson's production company Icon Productions, who loved it and got Gibson on board to produce. The screenplay had also been imagined as a horror film directed by genre veteran David Cronenberg and starring Al Pacino as the title character.

Reception
The film scored a 39% "Rotten" rating on Rotten Tomatoes, based on reviews from 108 critics, with an average rating of 5.09/10. The website's critical consensus reads: "Delightful performance from Robert Downey Jr. can't save The Singing Detective'''s transition from TV to the big screen". While some critics, such as Roger Ebert, liked the film, others, like Joe Baltake at the Sacramento Bee, considered it an "interesting failure".

Soundtrack
The soundtrack to The Singing Detective'' was released on October 14, 2003.  It consisted of songs from the 1950s rather than the 1940s as in the original television series.

References

External links
 
 
 
 
 Senses of Cinema review

2003 films
2003 independent films
2000s musical comedy-drama films
2000s mystery comedy-drama films
2000s crime comedy-drama films
American independent films
American musical comedy-drama films
American mystery comedy-drama films
2000s English-language films
Films directed by Keith Gordon
Films with screenplays by Dennis Potter
Adultery in films
Films about writers
Films based on television series
Films set in the 1950s
Films set in Los Angeles
Films shot in Los Angeles
Jukebox musical films
Self-reflexive films
Films about parallel universes
Icon Productions films
Paramount Vantage films
Metro-Goldwyn-Mayer films
Scanbox Entertainment films
Films produced by Mel Gibson
Films produced by Bruce Davey
American crime comedy-drama films
2003 comedy films
2003 drama films
Films produced by Steven Haft
2000s American films